Diascia integerrima, the entire-leaved twinspur, is a species of flowering plant in the family Scrophulariaceae, native to South Africa and Lesotho. It is the hardiest of the twinspurs, to USDA zone 6a. It gained the Royal Horticultural Society's Award of Garden Merit in 1995, but the award appears to have been recently revoked.

References

Scrophulariaceae
Flora of the Cape Provinces 
Flora of the Free State 
Flora of KwaZulu-Natal 
Flora of Lesotho
Plants described in 1836